Cerium diiodide is an iodide of cerium, with the chemical formula of CeI2.

Preparation 

Cerium diiodide can be obtained from the reduction of cerium(III) iodide with metallic cerium under vacuum at 800 °C to 900 °C.

It can also be formed from the reaction of cerium and ammonium iodide in liquid ammonia at −78 °C. The reaction forms an ammonia complex of cerium diiodide, which decomposes to cerium diiodide under vacuum at 200 °C.

It was first created by John D. Corbett in 1961.

Properties 

Cerium diiodide is an opaque dark solid with a metal-like appearance and properties. There is no cerium(II) in cerium diiodide, and its real structure is Ce3+(I−)2e−. It is easily hydrolyzed to form the corresponding iodide oxide. Like lanthanum diiodide and praseodymium diiodide, the cerium diiodide forms in the MoSi2-type structure, with space group I4/mmm (No. 139).

References 

Cerium compounds
Iodides
Substances discovered in the 1960s
Electrides